Phaeoptilum spinosum (brittle thorn) is a shrub that occurs in central Namibia. It is the only species in the genus Phaeoptilum. It is a valuable drought-resistant fodder plant, browsed by goats and kudu. The bush bears winged red fruits in October.

Gallery

References

External links
Gallery
Article 'Bäume an Rastplätzen und Fernstraßen'

Flora of Namibia
Nyctaginaceae
Monotypic Caryophyllales genera